Jared MacEachern (born August 16, 1980) is an American heavy metal musician, best known as a singer and rhythm guitarist of Sanctity. In 2013, he joined Machine Head as bassist, replacing Adam Duce.

Biography 
MacEachern started singing in his parents' church choir when he was five and did that until he was thirteen. He started playing musical instruments when he was ten, starting with the violin but then switching to cello, and then to bass guitar, which he played for several years.
He graduated from Frank W. Cox High School in Virginia Beach. He went to college for music performance for bass. He then met his future Sanctity bandmates and switched to guitar.

MacEachern became exposed to heavy metal music around the age of twelve. A friend had a copy of Metallica's Black album and he played the song "The Unforgiven." Afterwards, another friend gave MacEachern an old copy of Kill 'Em All. MacEachern was captivated, as he did not previously know music in that style existed. He considers his two favorite heavy metal albums to be Kill 'Em All and Arise by Sepultura. He became completely enamored with all the metal bands of that time, such as Metallica, Megadeth, Slayer and Pantera, but for his bass playing, his main influence was former Metallica bassist Cliff Burton.

Sanctity 
With a brief stint at the Brevard School for Music Performance, MacEachern has consistently played bass for over two decades. However, in Sanctity he played Rhythm Guitar. They formed in 1998 and have released one album, Road to Bloodshed, on April 24, 2007.

In February 2008, MacEachern left Sanctity for personal reasons. His child had recently been born and MacEachern wanted to focus on being a good father.

In October 2010, Serenity Dies, a thrash metal band from the Maldives formed in 2005, announced that it had begun writing new material with MacEachern, who stated: — "I'm really excited to join Serenity Dies. This band is exactly what I was looking for and I'm stoked that they asked me to be a part of it! We've already got our collective creative juices flowing, and new songs are in the works. We're all really looking forward to breaking some heads!"

Machine Head 
In June 2013, Machine Head announced that MacEachern had joined as an official member, replacing their former bassist and founding member, Adam Duce. The band released their first album with him in November 2014 entitled Bloodstone & Diamonds.

Discography 
With Sanctity
Beneath the Machine (Single) (2007)
Road to Bloodshed (2007)
With Machine Head
Bloodstone & Diamonds (2014)
Catharsis (2018)
Of Kingdom and Crown (2022)

References 

Living people
American heavy metal bass guitarists
Thrash metal musicians
American heavy metal singers
American male bass guitarists
1980 births
Machine Head (band) members
21st-century American male singers
21st-century American singers
21st-century American bass guitarists